Sokolye is a rural locality (a village) in Zheleznodorozhnoye Rural Settlement, Sheksninsky District, Vologda Oblast, Russia. The population was 11 as of 2002.

Geography 
Sokolye is located 29 km northwest of Sheksna (the district's administrative centre) by road. Biryuchyovo is the nearest rural locality.

References 

Rural localities in Sheksninsky District